Canora is a future station on the Réseau express métropolitain, expected to open in the fourth quarter of 2024. It is located in the Glenmount neighbourhood of Montreal, Quebec, Canada, just east of the Town of Mount Royal. The platforms are located northwest of the west portal of the Mount Royal Tunnel.

Until May 2020, Canora was a commuter rail station on Exo's Deux-Montagnes line and Mascouche line.

History
The station is located at 7300, Canora Road, immediately northwest of Jean Talon Street.

The station takes its name from Canora Road, which in turn takes its name from the first operator of this line, the Canadian Northern Railway, which built the line and operated it for a short time before it was merged into Canadian National Railway.

From the opening of the Deux-Montagnes Line in 1918 until the modernization of the line, which took place between 1993 and 1995, the station was called Portal Heights because of its location at the northwest end of the Mount Royal Tunnel.

The station is valued by the residents of not only the town of Mont-Royal, but also by those of the Côte-des-Neiges borough, for its fast connection with the downtown Central station involves a 7-minute journey via the tunnel.

Under the Réseau express métropolitain (REM) proposal, which would convert the Deux-Montagnes line to rapid-transit operation, a connecting station would be built on the Saint-Jérôme line adjacent to Canora across Rue-Jean-Talon.

Starting in May 2018, due to its 4-year-long process of being converted to light rapid transit, only one of the station's two platforms was being used for travel in both directions; the same was true for its neighbouring station Mont-Royal (outbound). The station was fully closed on May 11, 2020, in order to be converted into a REM station. It is slated to reopen in 2022.

Connecting bus routes

See also 
 Line 3 Red

References

External links
 Canora Commuter Train Station Information (RTM)
 Canora Commuter Train Station Schedule (RTM) - Deux-Montagnes line
 Canora Commuter Train Station Schedule (RTM) - Mascouche line
 2016 STM System Map

Former Exo commuter rail stations
Railway stations in Montreal
Côte-des-Neiges–Notre-Dame-de-Grâce
Réseau express métropolitain railway stations